The Stolley Homestead Site is a historic house in Grand Island, Nebraska. It was built in 1858-1859 as a log cabin by William Stolley, an immigrant from Schleswig-Holstein, Germany. The property was acquired by the state of Nebraska in 1927. It has been listed on the National Register of Historic Places since March 16, 1972.

References

	
National Register of Historic Places in Hall County, Nebraska
Houses completed in 1857
1857 establishments in Nebraska Territory